Puyloubier is a commune in the Bouches-du-Rhône department in southern France.

In Puyloubier can be found the Institution des invalides de la Légion étrangère which is a retirement home for former members of the French Foreign Legion.

Population

Personalities linked to the commune 
 Servin de Puyloubier, hermit and martyr, massacred by the Visigoths.
 Jacques Rigaud, designer and engraver, born in Puyloubier on 1 May 1680, died in Paris on 10 August 1754.
 Jean-Baptiste Rigaud, designer and engraver, born in Puyloubier on 17 April 1720, nephew of Jacques Rigaud.
 Rosalie Margalet, mother of the poet Victor Gélu, costumier, born in Puyloubier on 3 April 1770, died on 7 March 1854.
 Jean Planque, painter and collector of Swiss art, stayed here between 1948 and 1951.
 Francis Méano, international footballer, born in Puyloubier on 22 May 1931, died in a car accident near Reims on 26 June 1953.
 Pierre-Paul Jeanpierre, colonel in the Foreign Légion, killed in combat in 1958 near Guelma (Algeria,) interred in the carré des légionnaires in Puyloubier cemetery.
 Yvonne Gamy, actress, born Marseille on 10 June 1904, died in Marseille on 10 February 1997, was a longtime resident of Puyloubier.

See also
Communes of the Bouches-du-Rhône department

References

Communes of Bouches-du-Rhône
Bouches-du-Rhône communes articles needing translation from French Wikipedia